Vincent Kavečanský (14 March 1924 – 9 January 1983) was a Slovak physicist.

Kavečanský was born in Hrašovík, near Košice, modern day Slovakia.  After completing his higher education in mechanics in Košice in 1943, he studied mechanical engineering at the Slovak Technical School in Bratislava, and at the Czech Higher Technical Faculty in Prague.  He graduated in 1950.  He then worked as a mechanical engineer, and in 1952 took a position as an assistant professor at the Faculty of Physics in Košice.  From September 1, 1963 he worked as a physical engineer at the Natural Science Faculty UPJS.  He finished his thesis work on magnetic processes on surfaces of Fe-Si samples in 1967.  Kavečanský had a major role in the building of the experimental foundation of the Faculty of Physics in Košice.  His personal research accomplishments include his study of magnetic media, namely Fe-Si materials, and mono and polycrystallized materials.  He developed techniques to visualize the structure of electron domains using colloids and the Kerr effect.  In conjunction with the Institutes of Metal Density in the Czech Republic and Slovakia, he also worked on applying the results of basic research of metal densities to technical uses.  During his whole career in higher education, he was also involved with teaching.  He gave lectures to future physicists, served as an advisor to doctoral candidates, and contributed to textbooks.  Between 1970 and 1979, he was a regional representative in the Slovak National Physics Organization, and actively helped organize conferences on magnetism.  He died on 9 January  1983, in Košice.

External references

Slovak physicists
1924 births
1983 deaths